The mouse-tailed Atlantic spiny-rat (Trinomys myosuros) is a spiny rat species from South America. It is found in Brazil.

References

Trinomys
Mammals described in 1830
Taxa named by Hinrich Lichtenstein
Taxobox binomials not recognized by IUCN